The swimming competition at the 2006 South Asian Games happened between August 19–23, 2006, at the Sugathadasa Stadium Swimming Pool in Colombo, Sri Lanka.

Medal table

Results
India dominated the competition winning 32 out of a possible 38 gold medals, while hosts Sri Lanka won five gold medals with Bangladesh the only other country to win a gold medal.

Men's events

Women's events

References

Swimming at the South Asian Games
2006 South Asian Games
South Asian Games